Alois Adolf Riehl (27 April 1844 – 21 November 1924) was an Austrian neo-Kantian philosopher. He was born in Bozen (Bolzano) in the Austrian Empire (now in Italy).

Biography
Riehl studied at Vienna, Munich, Innsbruck and Graz. He earned his PhD from Innsbruck in 1868. He habilitated at Graz at 1870.

He worked as a full professor of philosophy at Graz from 1878, then at Freiburg (from 1882 as a replacement for Wilhelm Windelband), Kiel and Halle, and finally at Berlin, where he commissioned Mies van der Rohe to design his house in Neubabelsberg.

For Riehl, philosophy was not the teaching of Weltanschauung, but principally a criticism of perception.

He was the doctoral advisor of Paul Hensel and Oswald Spengler.

Riehl died in Neubabelsberg, near Potsdam, and was buried in the Alter Friedhof in Klein-Glienicke.

His wife Sofie, was the aunt of Frieda Gross, the wife of the Austrian medical doctor, scientist and revolutionary, Otto Gross.

Selected works 
 Der Philosophische Kriticismus und seine Bedeutung für die positive Wissenschaft, 1876 – Philosophical criticism and its importance for the positive science.
 Beiträge zur Logik, 1892 – Contributions to logic.
 "The principles of the critical philosophy", 1894 (translated into English by Arthur Fairbanks), London: Kegan Paul, Trench, Trübner, & Co., Ltd, 1894.
 Friedrich Nietzsche, der Künstler und der Denker, 1897 – Friedrich Nietzsche: the artist and the thinker.
 Zur Einführung in die Philosophie der Gegenwart, 1903 – An introduction to the philosophy of the present.
 Systematische philosophie, 1907 (with Wilhelm Dilthey) – Systematic philosophy.
 Der philosophische kritizismus, geschichte und system, 1908 – Philosophical criticism, history and system.

Notes

External links
 
 Bautz Biographical Dictionary
 

Kantian philosophers
1844 births
1924 deaths
19th-century philosophers
20th-century Austrian philosophers
Academic staff of the University of Graz
Academic staff of the University of Freiburg
Academic staff of the Humboldt University of Berlin
Academic staff of the University of Kiel
Academic staff of the University of Halle
19th-century German writers
19th-century German male writers
Writers from Bolzano